David Fowler may refer to:

David Fowler (physicist) (born 1950), environmental physicist and air pollution scientist
David Fowler (politician) (born 1958), member of the Tennessee Senate
David Fowler (mathematician) (1937–2004), British historian of Greek mathematics
David Fowler (merchant) (1826–1881), Scottish born wholesale grocer in Australia, co-founder of D. & J. Fowler Ltd.
 A prominent witness in the 2021 Trial of Derek Chauvin